The Wiltshire Army Cadet Force (Wiltshire ACF) is the county cadet force for Wiltshire, which operates as part of the Army Cadet Force.  Since 2014, the county has been part of Headquarters South West and comprises three companies along with a county corps of drums.

Background 
In 1863, along with the formation of the Volunteer Force, the first government sanctioned cadet groups were allowed to be formed.  These groups would mostly be formed in connection with existing volunteer companies and battalions.  Following the Territorial and Reserve Forces Act 1907 which organised the former Volunteer Force into a coherent organisation, known as the Territorial Force (TF), the cadets were expanded.  Each company consisted of no less than 30 cadets, and four of these companies formed a "Cadet Battalion", the predecessors to the modern "Cadet County".

Unlike their modern successors, the first cadet battalions were administered by their local County Territorial Force Associations, and rarely ever came under an "army command".  However, following changes to the organisation of the Cadets, in 1923 all cadet forces were taken under complete control of the County Associations.

The first mention of the "Wiltshire Army Cadet Force" appears in a supplement to the London Gazette for 15 June 1954.  The issue notes a chaplain 4th class, of the Royal Army Chaplains' Department transferring to the Dorset Army Cadet Force from the Wiltshire ACF effective 15 June 1954.

Organisation 
As of December 2021, the Wiltshire Army Cadet Force consists of appx. 700 cadets and 130 adult volunteers in 24 detachments.  Each Army Cadet Force 'county' is in-fact a battalion, and each 'detachment' equivalent to that of a platoon.  The county's is organised as follows:

 County Headquarters, Wiltshire Army Cadet Force, at Le Marchant Barracks, Devizes
 County Cadet Training Team, Wiltshire Army Cadet Force, at Le Marchant Barracks, Devizes

ACF Mission 
The Army Cadet Force is a national, voluntary, uniformed youth organisation. It is sponsored by the British Army but not part of it and neither the cadets nor the adult volunteer leaders are subject to military call-up.  They offer a broad range of challenging adventurous and educational activities, some of them on a military theme. Their aim is to inspire young people to achieve success in life and develop in them the qualities of a good citizen.

The ACF can be compared to their counterparts in the Junior Reserve Officers' Training Corps (USA), Hong Kong Adventure Corps, and Canadian Army Cadets, amongst others.

See also 

 List of Army Cadet Force units
 Combined Cadet Force

Footnotes

Notes

Citations

References 

 

Military units and formations in Wiltshire
Army Cadet Force
Army Cadet Force counties